Edith Atwater (April 22, 1911 – March 14, 1986) was an American stage, film, and television actress.

Career 
Born in Chicago, Atwater made her Broadway debut in 1933. In 1939, she starred in The Man Who Came to Dinner. Her film career included roles in The Body Snatcher (1945), Sweet Smell of Success (1957), It Happened at the World's Fair (1963), Strait-Jacket (1964), Strange Bedfellows (1965), True Grit (1969), The Love Machine (1971), Die Sister, Die! (1972), Mackintosh and T.J. (1975), and Family Plot (1976).

From 1964 to 1965, Atwater appeared in several episodes of the television series Peyton Place in the role of Grace Morton, wife of Dr. Robert Morton, who was played by her real-life husband Kent Smith. During the 1966–1967 television season, she appeared in the series Love on a Rooftop. She was also a regular on the television series Kaz during the 1978–1979 season. Her other television work included appearances on The Rockford Files, Hazel, Knots Landing, and numerous other series.

Atwater's work on Broadway included performances in Flahooley (1951), King Lear (1950), Metropole (1949), The Gentleman From Athens (1947), Parlor Story (1947), State of the Union (1945), R.U.R. (1942), Broken Journey (1942), Johnny on a Spot (1942), Retreat to Pleasure (1940), The Man Who Came to Dinner (1939), Susan and God (1937), The Masque of Kings (1937), The Country Wife (1936), This Our House (1935), Brittle Heaven (1934), Are You Decent (1934), and Springtime for Henry (1931).

Atwater was a member of the governing board of Actors' Equity Association.

Personal life and death
In November 1941, Atwater married actor Hugh Marlowe; they divorced in 1946. She was married to actor Kent Smith from 1962 until his death in 1985. She died of cancer in 1986 at Cedars-Sinai Medical Center at age 74. She had no children.

Legacy
Atwater's likeness was drawn in caricature by Alex Gard for Sardi's, the theatre-district restaurant in New York City. The picture is now part of the collection of the New York Public Library.

Filmography

See also

List of caricatures at Sardi's restaurant

References

Sources
 "Edith Atwater Is Dead at 74; Actress in Theater and Film" New York Times, March 17, 1986

External links
 
 
 
 

1911 births
1986 deaths
Actresses from Chicago
American film actresses
American television actresses
American stage actresses
Deaths from cancer in California
Actresses from Greater Los Angeles
20th-century American actresses